The Copa do Brasil 2007 is the 19th staging of the Copa do Brasil. 

The competition started on February 14, 2007 and concluded on June 6, 2007 with the second leg of the final, held at the Estádio Orlando Scarpelli in Florianópolis, in which Fluminense lifted the trophy for the first time with a 1-0 victory over Figueirense.

Knockout round

Final phase

Champion

External links
 Copa do Brasil 2007 at RSSSF

Copa Do Brasil, 2007
2007
Copa Do Brasil, 2007